Fifty Million Frenchmen is a 1931 American pre-Code musical comedy film directed by Lloyd Bacon. It was photographed entirely in Technicolor. The film was produced and released by Warner Brothers, and was based on Cole Porter's 1929 Broadway musical Fifty Million Frenchmen.

The film was originally intended to be released, in the United States, late in 1930, but was shelved due to public apathy towards musicals. Despite waiting a number of months, the public proved obstinate and the Warner Bros. reluctantly released the film in February 1931 after removing all the music. The film was released outside the United States  as a full musical comedy in 1931.

Plot
Set in Paris, the story concerns the exploits of wealthy Jack Forbes (William Gaxton), who bets his friend Michael Cummings (John Halliday) that he can woo and win Looloo Carroll (Claudia Dell) without using any of his money or connections. Cummings hires Simon and Peter (Ole Olsen and Chic Johnson), a pair of erstwhile detectives, to make sure that Forbes doesn't win his bet.

Instead, Simon and Peter befriend our hero and decide to help him out. Olsen & Johnson have all the best material, notably an early double entendre encounter with a randy American tourist (Helen Broderick) and a scene in which Olsen impersonates a mind-reading fakir (Bela Lugosi) – who loses his clothes in the process! The finale has the comedians being chased by every law officer in Paris.

Cast
 Ole Olsen as Simon Johanssen
 Chic Johnson as Peter Swanson
 William Gaxton as Jack Forbes 
 Helen Broderick as Violet
 John Halliday as Michael Cummins 
 Claudia Dell as Lu Lu Carroll  
 Lester Crawford as Billy Baxter 
 Evalyn Knapp as Miss Wheeler-Smith 
 Charles Judels as Pernasse – Hotel Manager
 Carmelita Geraghty as Marcelle Dubrey   
 Nat Carr and Vera Gordon as Jewish tourists
 Bela Lugosi as Orizon the Magician (uncredited)

Music
50 Million Frenchmen was originally a Cole Porter musical, but the songs were omitted from all prints of the film in the United States because box-office receipts for musical films at that time were down.

Box office
According to Warner Bros records the film earned $401,000 domestically and $29,000 internationally.

Preservation
Only a black and white copy of the cut print released in 1931 in the United States seems to have survived. The complete film was released intact in countries outside the United States where a backlash against musicals never occurred. It is unknown whether a copy of this full version still exists.

See also
 List of early color feature films

References

External links
 
 
 
 

1931 films
1931 musical comedy films
1931 romantic comedy films
1930s color films
American musical comedy films
American romantic comedy films
American romantic musical films
Films based on musicals
Films directed by Lloyd Bacon
Films set in Paris
Warner Bros. films
Early color films
1930s English-language films
1930s American films